A Conservative Party of British Columbia leadership election will be held on May 28, 2023, to elect a new party leader, following the resignation of Trevor Bolin.

Potential candidates
John Rustad, MLA for Nechako Lakes (2005–present), MLA for Prince George–Omineca (2005–2009), Minister of Aboriginal Relations and Reconciliation (2013–2017)

References 

2023 elections in Canada
2023 political party leadership elections